In Greek mythology, Tyrannus (Ancient Greek: Τύραννος means 'an absolute ruler') was a Taphian prince a son of King Pterelaus and brother of Chromius, Chersidamas, Antiochus, Mestor, Everes and Comaetho. He was killed, along with most of his brothers, by the sons of Electryon.

Notes

References 

 Apollodorus, The Library with an English Translation by Sir James George Frazer, F.B.A., F.R.S. in 2 Volumes, Cambridge, MA, Harvard University Press; London, William Heinemann Ltd. 1921. ISBN 0-674-99135-4. Online version at the Perseus Digital Library. Greek text available from the same website.

Princes in Greek mythology